Dennis Rollins,  (born 1964) is an English jazz trombonist, the founder and bandleader of BadBone and Co.

Early life and career
Dennis George Rollins was born in Birmingham, England, of Jamaican parents, and raised in Bentley, Doncaster, where he attended Don Valley High School. When he was 14 years old, he joined The Doncaster Youth Jazz Association, with which he studied and performed for some years before moving to London in 1987.

Rollins has recorded, performed, and toured with a host of musicians and bands in jazz and pop, including Courtney Pine, and Maceo Parker,.

In 1995 he formed his own jazz-funk band, Dee Roe, with which he performed at such venues as the Jazz Café, Ronnie Scott's Jazz Club, the London Forum, and Brixton Academy.

In 2000 he again formed a band, the quintet Dennis Rollins' BadBone and Co., launched at the Barbican Centre in March of that year, again specialising in funk-inflected jazz.

In 2005 he formed Boneyard, an ensemble featuring 10 trombones, sousaphone (or "sousabone"), and drums; this band performed a series of live gigs throughout the U.K. that summer as well as a performance on BBC Radio 3. Boneyard featured the British jazz trombonists Barnaby Dickinson, Matt Colman, Julian Hepple, Andy Derrick, Kevin Holborough, Harry Brown, and Lee Hallam, with Andy Grappy on sousaphone.

Current band members of Badbone&co are: Jay Phelps on trumpet, Johnny Heyes on guitars, Courtney Thomas on bass, Ross Stanley on keys and Jack Pollit on drums.

Rollins is an artist/clinician for Michael Rath Trombones. His personal instrument is a yellow brass/nickel silver Rath R3.

In the 2018 Queen's Birthday Honours list Rollins was awarded an MBE for services to music.

Recordings (as leader)
2000: Wild & Free (E.P.)
2001: BadBone
2003: Make Your Move
2006: Big Night Out

References

Literature 
 John Chilton, Who's Who of British Jazz, Continuum International Publishing Group, 2004,

External links

Dennis Rollins Official website
Myspace page
Kevin LeGendre, "Funk Is the Preacher, Jazz Is the Teacher", Jazzwise 97, May 2006, pp. 24–28)

1964 births
Living people
Musicians from Birmingham, West Midlands
English jazz trombonists
Male trombonists
21st-century trombonists
21st-century British male musicians
British male jazz musicians
Jazz Warriors members
Members of the Order of the British Empire
Motéma Music artists